"Safe House" is the ninth episode of the first season of the period drama television series The Americans. It originally aired on FX in the United States on April 3, 2013.

Plot
Philip (Matthew Rhys) and Elizabeth Jennings (Keri Russell) tell their children that they are separating.

The Beemans (Noah Emmerich and Susan Misner) host a party. During the party, Agent Frank Gaad (Richard Thomas) announces to Stan, Chris Amador (Maximiliano Hernández), and other agents that he plans to assassinate Arkady Ivanovich (Lev Gorn), the KGB's Resident, in retaliation for the deaths of the FBI agents from the previous episode.

Philip spends the night with Martha (Alison Wright). Martha reveals that Gaad intends to assassinate a KGB agent. In the morning, she leaves for work. Philip follows, but is stopped by Amador, who is stalking Martha. Amador tells Philip to come in for questioning, but he resists. When Amador pulls a knife, Philip turns it on him, wounding him badly. He puts Amador in his trunk and brings him to a safe house to treat the wound as Elizabeth arrives. They realize he was at Stan's party.

Stan notices Amador is late for work. He goes to Amador's apartment, finding only his car. He reports to Gaad, believing the KGB took Amador hostage. He later meets Nina (Annet Mahendru) and questions her about Amador.

Amador wakes up and asks for water. Philip asks him who the FBI intend to assassinate, but Amador denies any knowledge of the plan. Gaad prepares to seize Arkady when he is out running. Stan shows up, telling Gaad to abort as the KGB will kill Amador. At the embassy, Arkady tells Vlad, a KGB colleague he runs with, that he is not going running. Vlad goes anyway and Stan seizes him. Gaad allows Stan to interrogate Vlad. Unaware of what transpired, Amador tells Elizabeth that Arkady is the target, but he is already dead. Stan calls the embassy, telling Arkady that if they do not release Amador, he will kill Vlad.

Elizabeth calls Arkady to learn whether he is dead, but Arkady answers and she hangs up. Philip and Elizabeth are confused as to why Amador would lie and decide to overdose him on morphine. However, Amador has already died. Philip and Elizabeth dump the body; the police and Stan confirm it is him.

Stan asks Vlad if he works for the KGB. Vlad confirms that he does, but claims not to know anything. Stan shoots Vlad in the back of the head, killing him.

Production
The episode was written by Joshua Brand and directed by Jim McKay.

Reception
In its original American broadcast on April 3, 2013, "Safe House" was watched by 1.38 million viewers, according to Nielsen ratings.

References

External links
 

The Americans (season 1) episodes
2013 American television episodes

fr:Saison 1 de The Americans#Épisode 9 : La Planque